Buckingham Palace Road is a street that runs through Victoria, London, from the south side of Buckingham Palace towards Chelsea, forming the A3214 road. It is dominated by Victoria Station.

History
In the 18th century, the road was known as Chelsea Road and was often frequented by highwaymen. A reward of £10 was offered in 1752 for the capture of one of the worst offenders. Towards the southern end, Victoria Station was opened in 1866 and the adjacent Victoria Coach Station was built in 1932 in the Art Deco style.

In 1938, the Empire Terminal of Imperial Airways opened opposite the coach station, designed by Albert Lakeman, also in the Art Deco style. It allowed passengers to check-in before boarding special trains from Victoria Station to Croydon Airport or Southampton Docks for the flying boat service. The terminal continued in service until the end of the 1970s, by which time there were dedicated rail or bus connections to Gatwick and Heathrow Airports. It is now the headquarters of the National Audit Office.

Landmarks

Royal Mews, Queen's Gallery

The entrances to the Royal Mews and Queen's Gallery are in Buckingham Palace Road.

Scouts and Girl Guides

In June 1917, the Imperial Headquarters of the Boy Scouts' Association (since 1967, The Scout Association) moved to 25 Buckingham Palace Road from its previous office at 116 Victoria Street. It was in that building that the Boy Scouts' International Bureau (now the World Scout Bureau) was inaugurated in 1920. The UK Scout Headquarters remained at that address until December 1974, when it moved to Baden-Powell House.

The Girl Guides Association (now Girlguiding) rented offices within Scout Headquarters until 1929, when there was no longer storage space for the Association's records. Following a national fundraising campaign called "Save Our Stuff", the Guides were able to move into their own purpose-built headquarters at 17–19 Buckingham Palace Road, which they still occupy today.

Gallery

References

Streets in the City of Westminster
Odonyms referring to a building